Egyptian Canadians are Canadian citizens of Egyptian descent, first-generation Egyptian immigrants, or descendants of Egyptians who emigrated to Canada. According to the 2011 Census there were 73,250 Canadian citizens who are from Egypt, having an increase compared to those in the 2006 Census.

Egyptian-Canadians are mainly either Christians or Muslims. Most Christians are Coptic Orthodox with small numbers of Coptic Catholic and Coptic Protestant.  Muslims are mostly Sunni.

During the 1960s, 75% of Egyptian immigrants settled in Montreal. By 1991, 49% of Egyptian Canadians were in Quebec, whereas 41% were living in Ontario. By 2011, 54% of Egyptian Canadians were living in Ontario and 31% in Quebec. Most Egyptian Canadians are concentrated in Toronto, Montreal and Vancouver.

Religion
Throughout the 1970s, immigrants from Egypt to Canada consisted of both Christians and Muslims, who mostly left due to poverty in their home country. Starting in 1985, the Canadian government encouraged investors to immigrate, which attracted wealthy Egyptians; these are described as "more conservative and less exposed to European influences than previous arrivals”.

A 1989 survey of Egyptian Canadians in Quebec found that 35% were Copts, 20% Catholics, and 19% Muslims, while 13% followed other faiths and 12% did not indicate any religion.

The 2011 Census found that 73,250 people reported "Egyptian" ancestry and 3,570 reported "Coptic" ancestry. It also found that 16,255 people reported Coptic Orthodox church as their religion.

Egyptian Canadians by Canadian province or territory (2016)

Notable people 
Maryse Andraos - writer
Manuel Tadros – singer, songwriter, actor, comedian and voice actor
Xavier Dolan – filmmaker, son of Manuel Tadros
Mohamed Fahmy - journalist, author.
Jean Mohsen Fahmy - writer
Alex Erian - one of the two vocalists of Despised Icon
Fareeha 'Pharah' Amari, character in Overwatch (video game), has an Egyptian mother and Canadian father.
Mena Massoud - actor
Yasmine Mohammed - human rights activist, author
Ariel Helwani - sports journalist, born in Canada to an Egyptian Jewish father and Lebanese Jewish mother
Omar Marmoush - footballer, born in Egypt to Egyptian-Canadian parents and has dual Egyptian-Canadian citizenship
Noor Naga - writer

See also

Middle Eastern Canadians
Ethnic groups in Canada
Coptic Canadians
List of Copts
Coptic Orthodoxy in Canada
List of Coptic Orthodox Churches in Canada
Egyptian Americans
Egyptian Australians

References

External links
The first Coptic Orthodox Egyptian Church in Canada
Canadian Coptic Centre
Egyptian-Canadian Friendship Association

 
Ethnic groups in Canada
Arab Canadian

African Canadian